Thanda Gosht ( ALA-LC:  , English: Cold Meat) is a short story written by Saadat Hasan Manto. The book was first published in a literary magazine in March 1950 in Pakistan. Later it was published by Sang-e-Meel Publications. Manto was charged with obscenity for this story and faced a trial in criminal court.

Storyline 
The story is about the communal violence of 1947. Ishwar Singh, fails to make love to his mistress Kalwant. She suspects him of infidelity and in a fit of jealousy stabs him with his own dagger. While dying, Ishwar Singh admits his  crime getting involved in riots which broke in his village killing a  Muslim family  with same dagger and abducting a Muslim girl after breaking in their house and attempting to rape her, who was actually dead. Hence the title "cold flesh".

Adaptations
Mantostaan, a 2017 Indian film which adapted four short stories of Manto for the screen also included a segment based on "Thanda Ghosht". Other stories which were adapted included "Khol Do", "Assignment", and "Akhiri Salute". Manto, a 2018 Indian biographical drama film about Saadat Hasan Manto's later life includes an adaptation of Thanda Gosht and the long-drawn court trials on obscenity which followed, their severe toll on his health and finances and his eventual conviction.

References

External links 
Thanda Gosht in English
 Thanda Gosht ठंडा गोश्त in Hindi
Thanda Gosht ٹھنڈا گوشت in Urdu

Pakistani short stories
Pakistani fiction
1950 short stories
Saadat Hasan Manto
Sang-e-Meel Publications books
Short stories adapted into films